Clock angle problems are a type of mathematical problem which involve finding the angle between the hands of an analog clock.

Math problem
Clock angle problems relate two different measurements: angles and time. The angle is typically measured in degrees from the mark of number 12 clockwise. The time is usually based on a 12-hour clock.

A method to solve such problems is to consider the rate of change of the angle in degrees per minute. The hour hand of a normal 12-hour analogue clock turns 360° in 12 hours (720 minutes) or 0.5° per minute. The minute hand rotates through 360° in 60 minutes or 6° per minute.

Equation for the angle of the hour hand

where:
  is the angle in degrees of the hand measured clockwise from the 12 
  is the hour.
  is the minutes past the hour.
  is the number of minutes since 12 o'clock.

Equation for the angle of the minute hand

where:
  is the angle in degrees of the hand measured clockwise from the 12 o'clock position.
  is the minute.

Example
The time is 5:24. The angle in degrees of the hour hand is:

The angle in degrees of the minute hand is:

Equation for the angle between the hands
The angle between the hands can be found using the following formula:

where
  is the hour
  is the minute
If the angle is greater than 180 degrees then subtract it from 360 degrees.

Example 1
The time is 2:20.

Example 2

The time is 10:16.

When are the hour and minute hands of a clock superimposed?

The hour and minute hands are superimposed only when their angle is the same.

 is an integer in the range 0–11. This gives times of: 0:00, 1:05., 2:10., 3:16., 4:21., 5:27.. 6:32.,  7:38., 8:43., 9:49., 
10:54., and 12:00.
(0. minutes are exactly 27. seconds.)

See also
Clock position

References

External links
 https://web.archive.org/web/20100615083701/http://delphiforfun.org/Programs/clock_angle.htm
 http://www.ldlewis.com/hospital_clock/ - extensive clock angle analysis
 https://web.archive.org/web/20100608044951/http://www.jimloy.com/puzz/clock1.htm

Mathematics education
Elementary mathematics
Elementary geometry
Mathematical problems
Clocks